Hookergate School was a secondary school and sixth form located in High Spen in the Metropolitan Borough of Gateshead, England.

The school was formally merged with Ryton Comprehensive School in 2011, and was renamed Charles Thorp Comprehensive School (now Thorp Academy). The new school operated over both of the former school sites until 2012 when the school relocated completely to the former Ryton school campus.
The school campus went up for sale, with offers closing on 18 November 2015, to be sold as a 'development opportunity'.

The site upon where the school was located had been then used for filming of BBC Children programs such as Wolfblood and an spinoff of Tracy Beaker, 'The dumping grounds'.

However the school campus is now no longer required and has been put for sale for development.

References

External links 
Thorp Academy
UK Spots
Hookergate for Sale

Defunct schools in Gateshead
Educational institutions disestablished in 2011
2011 disestablishments in England